The Ledyard Bridge crosses the Connecticut River to connect Hanover, New Hampshire to Norwich, Vermont.  It is the third bridge at this crossing to bear the name of the adventurer John Ledyard.

History
The first "Ledyard Free Bridge" was a covered bridge built in 1859 that was the first bridge across the Connecticut not to charge a toll.  (It was the latest of several bridges at this site that went back to the late 18th century.)  The bridge was named after Ledyard in 1859 because its eastern abutment was near the site of a tree that Ledyard felled during 1773 in order to make the dugout canoe in which he left Dartmouth College to continue his world travels.

The bridge now standing was built between 1998 and 2000 by the New Hampshire Department of Transportation. At each end it displays a pair of "bridge balls," the controversial Classical ornaments cast in concrete that refer to the gateway to Tuck Drive nearby on the Hanover shore.  They are the product of a Concord architect brought in by NHDOT to infuse some extra aesthetic appeal into the design of the bridge.

The Ledyard Bridge carries the designation of New Hampshire Route 10A and Vermont Route 10A, a short state highway linking U.S. Route 5 and Interstate 91 on the Vermont side with New Hampshire Route 10 on the New Hampshire side. The Appalachian Trail uses the pedestrian walkway to cross the river.

Border location 
Although the border between New Hampshire and Vermont was set at the Vermont shore early in the states' histories, the bridge's monument to that border rests near the middle of the crossing; the reasoning is that the border was fixed before the Wilder Dam pushed the Vermont shore westward during the 1950s.

See also 
 List of crossings of the Connecticut River

References 

Appalachian Trail
Bridges completed in 1859
Bridges completed in 2000
Buildings and structures in Norwich, Vermont
Bridges over the Connecticut River
Bridges in Grafton County, New Hampshire
Road bridges in New Hampshire
Road bridges in Vermont
Former toll bridges in New Hampshire
Former toll bridges in Vermont
Beam bridges in the United States
Interstate vehicle bridges in the United States
1859 establishments in New Hampshire
1859 establishments in Vermont